
 
 

Scott Conservation Park (formerly Scott National Park) is a protected area located in the Australian state of South Australia in the locality of Currency Creek about  south of the state capital of Adelaide and about  north-west of the town centre in Currency Creek.

The conservation park consists of land in sections 218 and 347 in the cadastral unit of the Hundred of Goolwa. On 20 March 1969, it was proclaimed under the National Parks Act 1966 as Scott National Park. On 27 April 1972, it was reconstituted as Scott Conservation Park upon the proclamation of the National Parks and Wildlife Act 1972.

In 1980, it was described as follows:
A small park featuring vegetation representative of the eastern slopes of the southern Mount Lofty ranges. As one of few blocks of scrub in this region it is significant for conservation purposes… A small park on gently sloping land. The principal vegetation is an open forest of Eucalyptus leucoxylon but large patches of E. baxteri occur in the southern portion of the Park. Elsewhere mixed stands of E. leucoxylon with E. fasciculosa are found. The understorey is diverse but usually dominated by E. cosmophylla and Banksia ornata … Scott Conservation Park is in a minimally disturbed condition having suffered only light grazing in the past. The park is largely surrounded by cleared grazing land… 

The conservation park is classified as an IUCN Category III protected area. In 1980, it was included on the now-defunct Register of the National Estate.

See also
Protected areas of South Australia

References

External links
Scott Conservation Park webpage on the Protected Planet website
Scott Conservation Park webpage on the BirdsSA website

Conservation parks of South Australia
Protected areas established in 1969
1969 establishments in Australia
South Australian places listed on the defunct Register of the National Estate